Two Hands Clapping is 2002 album by reggae singer Snow. The single "Legal" hit the Canadian Singles Chart, peaking at #13. It was also Snow's only album to have a Parental Advisory sticker.

Track listing 
"Black N' Snow"
"Stay Ballin'"
"That's My Life"
"Missing You"
"Whass Up"
"Pride (Interlude)"
"Legal"
"The Way That U Do"
"Whisper of Truth (Interlude)
"Mistaken Identity"
"Lonely Song" (feat. Danny P)
"Biological
"Whole Nine Yards"
"Girl"
"Cinco de Mayo (Intro)"
"Cinco de Mayo"
"J Dot"

Year-end charts

References

2002 albums
Snow (musician) albums